Intec Digital is a record company rediscovered after four years of inactivity on the ground of Intec Records. Originally, Intec Records was started by Carl Cox and DJ C1 in 1998. The record label's greatest success was the summer hit "Sunshine" by Belgian act Tomaz vs. Filterheadz which sold a total of 25,000 copies.

Artists

Intec Records 

 Axel Karakasis
 Bryan Zentz
 Deetron
 Filterheadz
 Oxia
 Tomaz
 Valentino Kanzyani

Intec Digital 

 Adam Sheridan
 Angel De Frutos
 Ant Brooks
 Ben Sims
 Carl Cox
 Carlo Lio
 Cave
 Chris Count
 Christian Smith
 Christian Varela
 Chus & Ceballos
 Copy Paste Soul
 Danny Serrano
 DJ Boris
 DJ Jock
 Dosem
 Elio Riso
 End-JY
 Ferhat Albayrak
 Frankie Bones
 Harvey McKay
 Hiroki Esashika
 Ian O'Donovan
 Jason Fernandes
 Jim Master
 Jim Rivers
 Joe Brunning
 Jon Rundell
 Just Be
 Layton Giordani
 Marco Bailey
 Mark Fanciulli
 Mark Maitland
 Mars Bill
 Mindskap
 MiniCoolBoyz
 Nicole Moudaber
 Onionz
 Philipp Ruhmhardt
 Pirupa
 Project AKC
 Rafa Barrios
 Ramiro Lopez
 Robert Babicz
 Saeed Younan
 Stephan Hinz
 Steve Mulder
 Tom Pooks
 Tomy DeClerque
 Trevor Rockcliffe
 Umek
 Valentino Kanzyani
 Victor Calderone

See also
 List of electronic music record labels

References

British record labels
Electronic music record labels
Record labels established in 1998